Valley of Desolation may refer to:

The Valley of Desolation in the Karoo region of South Africa
The Valley of Desolation on the Bolton Abbey Estate in North Yorkshire, United Kingdom